For almost a century in the United States, men and boys swam nude in indoor swimming pools, generally for education or athletics. Male nude swimming had been customary in natural bodies of water since the 18th century. The tradition of skinny-dipping in secluded spots had become more visible with urbanization, and pools were a means of separating swimmers from public view.  For the first decades of the 20th century, male nude swimming was associated with a trope of the "old swimming hole" as representing childhood innocence and adult masculinity. In their own classes, nudity was rare for girls based upon an assumption of modesty, but might include very young children. The nudity of pre-pubescent boys might be allowed in mixed-gender settings, including female coaches for the youngest boys' classes, public competitions, and awards ceremonies with spectators.

At the beginning of the 20th century, the primary reason given for nudity by officials was for public health, swimming pools being prone to contamination by water-borne diseases. During the early developmental stages of filtration and chlorination, behavioral measures were also needed to keep the water clean. Because indoor pools were generally male only, the health of swimmers could be monitored most easily by forbidding swimsuits, which often were a source of contamination, while female swimmers wore suits that were more hygienic. As the century continued, more indoor pools were built by local governments and schools, primarily in northern states, to provide year-round swimming as a sport. As with other physical education activities, swimming was gender-segregated.

Recreational swimming had been an activity for the warm months in outdoor pools or open water. In the 1960s, indoor pools also started to become recreational with mixed-sex usage, which ended nude swimming at individual pools. After the passage of Title IX in 1972, requiring gender equality in physical education, most schools found coed use of swimming pools to be the easiest means of compliance. A generation later, nude swimming in public pools as a widespread practice was forgotten, and in the 21st century sometimes denied having existed.

Origins of swimming pools
"Swimming baths" and pools were built beginning in the late 19th century in poorer neighborhoods of eastern cities to exert some control over a public swimming culture that offended Victorian sensibilities by including not only nakedness, but roughhousing and swearing. Such behavior had begun in the 18th century, but laws prohibiting public indecency had little effect. Naked swimmers from Milwaukee, Wisconsin to New York City sometimes flaunted themselves intentionally in view of more upper class passers-by. 

Beginning in 1870, the first public pools in New York City were outdoor "floating baths" of wood surrounded by docks that allowed river water to flow through them. In addition to health and hygiene, they were intended to prevent drowning in the open river, which was a frequent occurrence. As the quality of urban river water declined, floating baths became a source of infection. Building indoor pools, and the addition of pools to bathhouses, was done to address this problem. Since few swimmers in these neighborhoods could afford swimsuits or wanted to wear them, nudity among males was taken for granted.

Racial segregation 
Public schools and recreation facilities are often segregated in the United States, by law until the passage of the Civil Rights Act of 1964, de facto due to residential patterns. Prior to the 1960s, the YMCA built separate facilities in black and white neighborhoods. The first black YMCA with a pool was the Twelfth Street YMCA in Washington, DC. Swimming nude was required, but did not appeal to all.

Public health recommendations
As early as 1918, pool operators and professionals addressed the problem of maintaining the quality of water due to the prevalence of waterborne diseases, including typhoid, dysentery and pneumonia, as well as infections of the eye and ear. Initially civil engineers recommended nudity for all swimmers, male and female, where such rules could be enforced. While this was generally accepted for men, it was true for only a few pools when used by women. Fibers from wool suits clogging pool filters were also given as a reason for nudity. In 1926, the American Public Health Association (APHA) standards handbook recommended that indoor swimming pools used by men adopt nude bathing policies and that indoor swimming pools used by women require swimsuits "of the simplest type". From 1926 until 1962, every edition of the guidelines recommended nude swimming for males. Given the limits of chlorination and filtration at that time, behavioral measures were used to maintain water quality. In addition to recommending nudity, all bathers were required to empty their bladder and shower nude before entering the pool. Those suffering from skin or respiratory disease were prohibited from using the pool. The close monitoring of swimmers was based upon their being from the working class, having generally poor hygiene and often living in tenements with no bath facilities. Officially, YMCAs and municipal pools were built in working-class neighborhoods to provide such facilities.

Public pools

Young Men's Christian Association
The first YMCA indoor pool in the United States was built in 1885, in Brooklyn, New York. 
YMCAs everywhere had nude swimming until they became mixed-gender in the 1960s and 70s. During the transition, an attempt was made to retain male nudity by limiting access to the pool by women to certain hours, but since they had full membership, this plan was deemed discriminatory.

Boy's clubs
A 1940 article in LIFE magazine describes the pool in the  Olneyville Boy's Club as providing an alternative to juvenile delinquency in a declining mill neighborhood. Photos show the naked boys crowded into the "dingy little 60 ft. swimming pool" as they had for fifteen years. In 1941 the Olneyville Club won two of the five final events at a national Boys Club of America swimming championship.

Public schools
The 1909 elementary school swimming championship for New York City included nearly forty schools in Manhattan, the Bronx, and Brooklyn; and was held at what was then called the Interior Public Bath, the first municipal indoor swimming pool built in New York City. In the 1920s, schools began building indoor swimming pools for purposes of physical fitness and swimming instruction. In 1900, there were only 67 public pools in the United States; by 1929 there were more than 5,000.

In 1935 the school superintendent in Pontiac, Michigan approved nude swim classes for boys in high school, saying it recalled "the days of the old swimming hole". In 1940 a New York City school official continued to favor boys wearing bathing suits only in pools visible to both sexes. Girls were issued cotton suits that could be boiled to disinfect them between uses; the wool suits used by boys could not because they would shrink and lose their shape. It was also noted that wool suits owned by swimmers that had previously been used in salt water could not be washed effectively because salt prevents soap from lathering. In addition, fibers from wool swimsuits could clog pool filters. Swim classes were advocated not only for exercise, but as a recreational activity that, once learned, could become a lifelong pursuit. The swim classes were also looked upon as an opportunity to teach children proper hygiene.

In a survey of Indiana high schools in 1939, all boys swim classes were nude, while girls wore suits, 87% being cotton suits issued by the school. Students bringing their own suits was discouraged, the institutions not having control of decontamination. A 1947 survey of schools in northern Utah found more local variation. Only three of the six schools had pools. One allowed swimmers to wear their own suits, one supplied cotton suits. At the one that required nudity, the athletic director cited the problem of lint from suits clogging the pool filter. In 1963, as it had for 33 years, the city of Troy, New York continued its mandetory citywide program of swim classes for all students in grades 4-8 and 9-12; boys swimming nude. A letter to parents emphasized the importance of learning at least the basics of swimming for survival in an emergency. The October 16, 1950 Life magazine published a photograph of boys swimming together in the indoor pool of New Trier High School in Winnetka, Illinois; the caption did not mention they were naked.

Girls classes 
One book on public health did agree that nudity would be the most sanitary option for girls as well as boys, and that this was practiced at some schools, but never universally as with boys. In 1947 the 150 girls age 9 to 13 at the Liberty School in Highland Park, Michigan were directed to wear swimsuits by the Superintendent of Schools in response to a group of mothers protesting to the board of education. Nude swimming for girls had been optional for six weeks prior to the order. Nude swim classes continued for the 200 elementary school girls from two other schools. Boys in the schools had not worn suits in their separate classes for years, and girls requested to do the same in order to give them more time in the pool rather than changing.  While following the wishes of parents who believed girls should behave modestly, all the board members disagreed, stating that there was "no moral issue involved".

Colleges and universities 
In 1920, a review of swimming pools found similar concerns for hygiene at the collegiate level. "In men's pools, where bathing suits are not ordinarily worn," inspection of swimmers was done by attendants to see that a thorough preliminary shower was taken.

'Learn to swim' programs
High school, college, and YMCA pools in the Midwestern United States were used to teach younger children to swim during weekends and summer programs, announcements noting that boys would not wear suits in indoor pools. The Sheboygan, Wisconsin Department of Public Recreation held "Learn to Swim" classes for children ages 9 to 14 at the Central High School pool. The classes were held on Saturday morning during the school year, Monday through Friday mornings in summer. Through the 1950s until 1960, the Sheboygan Press published the schedules of the separate classes for boys and girls, noting that girls would be issued suits, but boys would be nude. A longer article in 1954 included details on the conduct of classes. There were four teachers, three men and one woman. Because female coaches were generally assigned to beginners, younger boys were taught by a woman. "Boys swim unhampered by suits and bring only a towel as their contribution each afternoon. Girls bring their own bathing caps and are supplied with suits, for the morning workout". All swimmers were required to take a soap shower nude before entering the pool. The final class was designated visitor's day, with no mention of boys not being nude with families present.  After 1960, all students were required to bring their own suits because mixed-sex recreational sessions had been added to the schedule.

Questioning and decline of nudity
New developments in pool chlorination, filtration, and nylon swimsuits led the APHA to abandon its recommendation of nude swimming for males in 1962. However, the custom did not immediately cease.

In 1961, parents and students in Menasha, Wisconsin asked the school board to give boys permission to wear swim trunks. The board voted down a petition signed by 371 parents on the grounds that buying swim trunks would be expensive and that nude swimming built men's character; one board member asserted that "this experience is a good one for later life, for example the armed services, where the disregard for privacy is real and serious". Another board member noted that swimmers had no privacy in the gang showers required for the classes. A letter from the Department of Public Education stated that nudity for boys was practiced throughout the state to promote sanitation and to save time. A survey of other schools found suits were worn only at schools where the pool was not completely separate from other areas.

In Janesville, Wisconsin nude swimming became an issue at Marshall Junior High in 1967 in part because boys at nearby Franklin Junior High wore suits because their pool had outside windows. The boys at Franklin were issued nylon suits, as were the girls at both schools. One coach noted that boys being from different backgrounds and being at different stages of maturity, some found nudity embarrassing, while others took it for granted. Parents, physicians, and clergy voiced various positions pro and con. The deciding factor was again the cost of purchasing suits for all boys.

In a 1973 Duluth, Minnesota school board meeting, a discussion of "skinny-dipping" in the boys junior high school swim classes following complaints from parents who cited modesty according to the supervisor of physical education. A school board member called this false modesty in a gym class where students must shower nude. For the board, the issue was the $12,000 needed to buy suits for 2500 students in the district.

During the 1970s, the adoption of mixed-gender swimming led to the gradual abandonment of nude male swimming in schools. Federal Title IX rules mandating gender equality in physical education led most schools to switch to co-educational classes, ending nude swimming in public schools by the 1980s. In the 21st century, the practice has been forgotten, denied having existed, or viewed as an example of questionable behaviors in the past that are no longer acceptable. However, Jungian psychoanalyst Barry Miller views the sexualization of nudity in male only situations such as locker rooms and swimming pools as a loss.

Notes
a.Located at 232 West 60th Street, Manhattan, Interior Public Bath had been built in 1906. In 2013 the West 60th Street bath building reopened after extensive renovations as the Gertrude Ederle Recreation Center.

References

History of swimming